Home Sweet Home is the debut album by British rapper Kano. It was released on 27 June 2005 by 679 Recordings. Kano was 20 years old when the album was released. The album received highly positive reviews from music critics and peaked at number 36 on the UK Albums Chart. Six singles were released from the album— "P's and Q's", "Typical Me" featuring Ghetts, "Remember Me", "Nite Nite" featuring Leo the Lion & The Streets, "Brown Eyes" and "Signs in Life". Two of the singles, "Typical Me" and "Nite Nite", peaked within the top 30 of the UK Singles Chart.

Critical reception

The album received widespread acclaim, At Metacritic, which assigns a normalized rating out of 100 to reviews from mainstream critics, the album received an average score of 82, based on 12 reviews, indicating "universal acclaim".

Commercial performance 
Home Sweet Home entered and peaked on the UK Albums Chart at number 36 on 3 July 2005. It is Kano's third highest-charting album of his career, after London Town (2007) and Made in the Manor (2016). Despite its relatively low peak, it is his highest-selling album, having reached Gold status in the UK, while the aforementioned two albums have thus far reached Silver status.

Track listing 

Sample credits
 "I Don't Know Why" contains samples from "War Pigs" by Black Sabbath.
 "Reload It" contains samples from "I Dig Love" by Asha Puthli

Personnel 
Credits for Home Sweet Home adapted from Allmusic.

 Kano – primary artist, composer
 Dick Beetham – mastering
 Dan Stacey – A&R
 Ben Sansbury – Art direction, design
 Mike Skinner – producer, arranger, mixing
 Fraser T. Smith – producer, guitar, mixing
 Paul Epworth – producer, guitar
 Joe Fields – producer, mixing

 D Double E - featured artist
 Leo the Lion – primary artist
 Josh Garza – drums
 Leo Bubba Taylor – drums
 Beni G – scratching
 Simon Finch – trumpet
 James Moriarty – photography

Charts

Certifications

References

2005 debut albums
Kano (rapper) albums
679 Artists albums
Albums produced by Fraser T. Smith